Thomas Stephen Gulotta (April 27, 1944 – August 4, 2019) was an American Republican politician from Nassau County, New York who was the county executive of Nassau from 1987 to 2001.

Early life
Gulotta was born in Oceanside, New York on April 27, 1944, the son of Josephine and Frank Gulotta, Sr. His father was a former Nassau County district attorney and former New York State Supreme Court judge. The younger Gulotta was raised on Long Island and attended Malverne High School, where he was student president. He graduated from Trinity College, and earned a law degree from Columbia Law School in 1969.

Career
Gulotta was a member of the New York State Assembly from 1977 to 1981, sitting in the 182nd, 183rd and 184th New York State Legislature. He represented a district that included his hometown of Merrick, New York until 1981 when he was selected to become the presiding supervisor of the town of Hempstead, succeeding Al D'Amato, who had been elected to the United States Senate. He was re-elected to the position in 1983.

In January 1987, Gulotta was appointed county executive by the county's board of supervisors, and was elected to a full term in November 1987. He opted not to run for a fifth term in 2001, after having won 11 straight elections. His successor was Democrat Thomas Suozzi.

Gulotta later founded Executive Strategies, a consulting firm, and joined the law firm of Shaw, Licitra, Bohner, Eserino, Schwartz & Pfluger in Mineola, New York, and was named a partner of the firm in 2004. At the time of his death in 2019 Gulotta was a special counsel at Albanese & Albanese, LLP, a law firm in Garden City, New York.

Personal life
Gulotta married Elizabeth Abbott Fryatt; they had two living children.

Thomas Gulotta died on August 4, 2019 at the age of 75.

References

Trinity College (Connecticut) alumni
Columbia Law School alumni
Nassau County Executives
Republican Party members of the New York State Assembly
1944 births
2019 deaths
People from Oceanside, New York
People from Merrick, New York
New York (state) lawyers
Malverne High School alumni
20th-century American lawyers